Reginald Beckford was a Panamanian sprinter and businessman.  In 1930, during the Central American Games in Havana, Cuba, Beckford distinguished himself as the first Panamanian to obtain a gold medal at an international sporting event.

Sources 
 Chronology of Panamanian Athletics (Spanish)
 Central American and Caribbean Games
  History of Panama (Spanish)

Panamanian male sprinters
Year of birth missing
Year of death missing
Central American and Caribbean Games gold medalists for Panama
Central American and Caribbean Games bronze medalists for Panama
Competitors at the 1930 Central American and Caribbean Games
Competitors at the 1935 Central American and Caribbean Games
Central American and Caribbean Games medalists in athletics